Halictus maculatus is a species of insects belonging to the family Halictidae.

It is native to Europe and Eurasia.

References

maculatus
Insects described in 1848